Bahir Dar International Stadium is an unfinished multi-purpose stadium in Bahir Dar, Amhara Region, Ethiopia.  It is used mostly for football matches although it also has athletics facilities.  The stadium has a capacity of 60,000 people. Currently, the stadium is the largest in the country by capacity, but currently lacks seats, an awning, or any facilities, such as concessions or bathrooms, beyond structural concrete elements.

History
The construction of Bahir Dar Stadium was started in 2008 by MIDROC Ethiopia. In 2015, the stadium received recognition from CAF and FIFA and hosted its first international matches.

In March 2015, the stadium hosted the CAF Confederation Cup match between Dedebit F.C. and Cote d'or of Seychelles. On June 14, 2015, Bahir Dar Stadium hosted 2017 Africa Cup of Nations qualification match between Ethiopia and Lesotho. The game was attended by more than 70,000 spectators which was well over the capacity of the stadium.

On June 21, 2015, Bahir Dar Stadium hosted the 2016 African Nations Championship qualification match between Ethiopia and Kenya. Ethiopia defeated Kenya in front of more than 60,000 spectators.

The Ethiopian football federation collected a record 1 million Birr from the gate fee for the match between  Ethiopia  and Lesotho. As a result of the large seating capacity of the stadium and the big revenue it generates, the Ethiopian Football Federation has plans to use the Bahir Dar Stadium as a home venue for the national team until the Addis Ababa National Stadium in Addis Ababa is completed.

In November 2015, the Ethiopian Football Federation announced that Bahir Dar Stadium has been selected as one of the three host cities for the 2015 CECAFA Cup. The Stadium is also expected to host the would be largest music concert in Ethiopia on January 21, 2018, with Teddy Afro's "Wede Fikir Guzo" (translated as 'A trip to love')

References

Athletics (track and field) venues in Ethiopia
Football venues in Ethiopia
Multi-purpose stadiums in Ethiopia
Ethiopia